Sean T. Kean (born May 21, 1963) is an American Republican Party politician, who has served in the New Jersey General Assembly since being sworn into office on January 10, 2012, representing the 30th legislative district, Prior to redistricting, Kean served in the New Jersey Senate from 2008 to 2012, representing the 11th legislative district. He had previously represented the 11th district in the General Assembly from 2002 to 2008.

Biography
Kean was born in Montclair, grew up in Deal and attended Red Bank Catholic High School. He is of Irish heritage and has family ancestry in County Cork.

Kean received a B.A. in 1988 from Seton Hall University in Political Science, was granted an M.A.L.S. in 1992 from Columbia University in American Studies and was awarded a J.D. from the Seton Hall University School of Law in 1995. Before becoming an attorney, Kean was a member of the Heavy and General Construction Laborers Local 472 Union (a branch of the Laborers' International Union of North America) in Newark from 1984 until 1988. Kean served as an aide to State Senator John O. Bennett from 1994 through 1996. He served on the Monmouth County Environmental Council from 1999 to 2001 and on the Wall Township Planning Board from 2001 to 2002. Prior to 1994, Kean had been registered a Democrat.

Kean is a resident of Wall Township where he lives with his wife Bridget and triplets born in July 2012. Kean formerly wrote a column titled "Legislative Matters" in The Coast Star, a weekly local newspaper in Monmouth County. His column typically contains news from the statehouse in Trenton, opinions on issues facing his district, and criticism of the state's Democratic Party.

Legislative career
Kean first took his seat in the Assembly on October 28, 2002, following his selection by the District 11 Republican County Committee members to fill the vacancy created by the death of Assemblyman Thomas S. Smith. Despite not having the endorsement of Monmouth County Republican Chair William F. Dowd and the district's other Assemblyman Steve Corodemus, Kean won the special convention vote winning a majority of the vote (113 votes) on the first ballot defeating Long Branch councilman Anthony Giordano (81 votes) and former Asbury Park mayor Carl Williams (13 votes). He would win election to full two-year terms in 2003 and 2005.

In the Assembly, he was the Assistant Republican Whip from 2004 to 2008. In his first stint in the Assembly, Kean served in the State Government Committee and the Transportation and Public Works Committee.

In 2007, 11th District Senator Joseph A. Palaia opted to retire at the end of his term. Kean sought election to the seat and defeated former professional football player and Assemblyman John Villapiano 63%-37%. During the first two years of his four-year Senate term, he served on the Legislative Services Commission, Labor, and Transportation Committees. In the next two years, he was a member of the Health, Human Services and Senior Citizens Committee and the Transportation Committee.

As a result of the 2011 legislative redistricting, Kean's hometown of Wall Township was placed into the 30th Legislative District setting up a potential primary election with fellow Republican Senator Robert Singer. Kean avoided such a fight by instead successfully running for election to the Assembly alongside David Rible (who was one of Kean's Assembly successors). In his current term in the Assembly, he is on the Consumer Affairs and Regulated Professions Committees.

Committees 
Committee assignments for the current session are:
Regulated Professions

District 30
Each of the 40 districts in the New Jersey Legislature has one representative in the New Jersey Senate and two members in the New Jersey General Assembly. The representatives from the 30th District for the 2022—23 Legislative Session are:
Senator Robert Singer (R)
Assemblyman Sean T. Kean (R)
Assemblyman Ned Thomson (R)

Election history

References

External links
Assemblyman Sean T. Kean's Legislative Website, New Jersey Legislature
New Jersey Legislature financial disclosure forms
2011 2010 2009 2008 2007 2006 2005 2004
Sean T. Kean, Project Vote Smart
New Jersey Voter Information Website 2003

Living people
1963 births
Catholics from New Jersey
Columbia University alumni
American people of Irish descent
Republican Party New Jersey state senators
Republican Party members of the New Jersey General Assembly
People from Deal, New Jersey
People from Montclair, New Jersey
People from Wall Township, New Jersey
Politicians from Monmouth County, New Jersey
Red Bank Catholic High School alumni
Seton Hall University School of Law alumni
21st-century American politicians